The Chosen is a 1981 American drama film directed by Jeremy Kagan, based on the best-selling book of the same name by Chaim Potok, published in 1967. It stars Maximilian Schell and Rod Steiger. At the 1981 Montréal World Film Festival, the film won Grand Prix of the Americas, and Steiger won best actor. Analysis Film Releasing Corp and 20th Century Fox released it in the US in April 1982.

Plot

The film is set in Brooklyn. The story begins  during the latter part of the Second World War. Reuven Malter is a middle-class Modern Orthodox Jewish teenager and son of David Malter, a college professor and a dedicated Zionist. At a baseball game between their schools, Reuven meets Danny Saunders, another Jewish teenage boy. At first, the meeting is one of enmity since Danny accidentally injures Reuven's eye during the game; this results in Reuven wearing an eye patch for much of the movie. When Danny goes to visit Reuven at the hospital to apologize, Reuven refuses his apology and asks him to leave. Later, Danny comes to Reuven's house to again apologize.  This time, Reuven accepts his apology and the boys become friends despite their different  backgrounds. Danny is the eldest son of a Hasidic Rebbe, the dynastic leader of the Hasidic Jews in that neighborhood, but is not close to his father. Danny has been going to the nearby public library and reading books on psychology. He amazes Reuven with his ability to remember word-for-word what he has read. It turns out that David Malter has been showing him these books. Reuven and Danny go to a Sabbath service in Danny's Hasidic community as Danny is eager for Reuven to meet his father. Danny's father approves of their friendship, but Rebbe Saunders disapproves of Professor Malter's writings, which doesn't surprise anyone. Rebbe Saunders also wishes for Danny to become a rabbi and to  succeed him in leading his Hasidic community, in keeping with the tradition of several generations, but Danny doesn't seem eager to pursue this.

Some time later, the boys begin attending Hirsch College, a Jewish university. While Reuven finds college life exciting and challenging, Danny finds it hard to adjust to, especially when his psychology professor denounces Sigmund Freud, who fascinates Danny. During this time, World War II ends and Reuven takes Danny to his first movie. After the movie, a newsreel begins and broadcasts the horrors of the concentration camps and the genocide of over six million Jews in Europe; Rebbe Saunders is horror-stricken by this too. Shortly after this, the question arises of whether a Jewish state should be re-formed in the Land of Israel, where many European Jews have emigrated. When Professor Malter goes to Chicago for a conference to debate the issue,  Reuven stays with Danny's family. He meets the rest of the family, including Danny's sister Shaindel, to whom he is attracted. In time Reuven is  accepted by the family. When he attends a Hasidic wedding with them, Danny gently breaks the news to Reuven that he can't pursue a relationship with Shaindel, because her future marriage has already been arranged.

After Professor Malter returns, he becomes engrossed in the creation of Israel and writes several articles and speeches about it. This controversial issue creates friction between Hasidic and Modern Orthodox Jews. While Modern Orthodox Jews believe that creating a Jewish state in Palestine is the right thing to do, Hasidic Jews believe that only the Messiah will grant them Palestine. This results in Rebbe Saunders excommunicating Reuven from the family, which adds to growing friction between Danny and Reuven. Eventually, the United Nations passes a resolution that partitions the Palestine Mandate territory, laying the ground for the Third Jewish Commonwealth in the Land of Israel, Israel. Rebbe Saunders allows Reuven to come back so that the two friends can reconcile. It is also revealed that Danny plans to transfer to Columbia University to pursue a psychology degree and Reuven plans to be a rabbi. Rebbe Saunders approves of Danny's plans and finally reveals why he was so distant from Danny: when Danny was younger, his father was impressed by how much Danny remembered when he had read something; however, blessed with this great ability, Danny became a know-it-all who felt indifferent towards other people and their troubles. As a result, Rebbe Saunders had to teach him empathy and the wisdom and pain of being alone by distancing himself from Danny and thus "teaching through silence", just as Rebbe Saunders' own father had taught him. Rebbe Saunders also tells Danny to keep his Jewish faith. This results in a tearful Danny reconciling with his father. In the end, Danny and his father enjoy a good relationship, although Danny changes his appearance, such as shaving his beard, which had been an important part of his Hasidic tradition, and adopting more modern-style clothing rather than the traditional black-colored suits that he had worn up till then. Danny and Reuven part ways as Danny prepares for his new life.

Cast

Reception
The Chosen holds a 75% approval rating on Rotten Tomatoes, based on 12 reviews. Variety called it "a first-rate adaptation" that tells a universal story. Janet Maslin of The New York Times wrote: "What The Chosen lacks in dramatic excitement, it tries hard to make up for in atmosphere".We couldn’t get anyone from the very orthodox Hasidic groups to portray these boys [in the film]; some Hasidim had even taken ads out in Yiddish papers urging people not to participate in this movie.

- Jeremy Kagan, director

References

External links
 
 
 
 

1981 films
1981 drama films
20th Century Fox films
American drama films
Films scored by Elmer Bernstein
Films about Jews and Judaism
Films based on American novels
Films directed by Jeremy Kagan
Films produced by Ely Landau
Films set in Brooklyn
Films set in the 1940s
Films about Orthodox and Hasidic Jews
Orthodox Judaism in fiction
1980s English-language films
1980s American films